Jill S. Tietjen (born 1954) is an American electrical engineer, consultant, women's advocate, author, and speaker. She is the president and CEO of Technically Speaking, Inc., an electric utilities consulting firm which she founded in Greenwood Village, Colorado, in 2000. She has written or co-authored ten books and more than 100 technical papers. A strong advocate for the participation of women and girls in the STEM fields, she establishes scholarships for women in engineering and technology, and nominates women for awards and halls of fame. She was inducted into the Colorado Women's Hall of Fame in 2010 and the Colorado Authors' Hall of Fame in 2019.

Early life and education
She was born Karen Jill Stein in Newport News, Virginia, in 1954. She is the oldest of four children. Her father, a PhD in engineering, worked at NASA.

She graduated from Hampton High School and entered the third class opened to women at the University of Virginia, in 1972. She graduated in 1976 with a major in applied mathematics and minor in electrical engineering. She was one of the first 10 women to graduate in engineering from that university. She began working at Duke Power Company in Charlotte, North Carolina, and went on to earn her MBA at the University of North Carolina at Charlotte in 1979.

Career
After five years as a planning engineer with Duke Power, she moved to Denver, Colorado, in 1981 to become a planning analyst for Mobil Oil Corporation in the company's mining and coal division. As the energy business took a downturn in 1983, the following year she entered consulting work for electric utilities as assistant vice president of Stone & Webster Management Consultants in Greenwood Village, a position she held from 1984 to 1992. From 1992 to 1995 she was a principal with RCG/Hagler Bailly in Boulder, managing utility planning. She returned to Stone & Webster to run their Denver office from 1995 to 1997. During the latter period, she served as an expert witness for electric utilities before Federal and state regulatory commissions.

From 1997 to 2000, Tietjen turned to women's education as director of the Women in Engineering Program at the University of Colorado Boulder. Between 1997 and 2008 she was an accreditor for engineering programs nationwide, including those on behalf of the Institute of Electrical and Electronics Engineers (IEEE).

In 2000 she formed her own company, Technically Speaking, Inc., to provide consulting services to electric utilities. From 2001 to 2008 she worked as a senior engineer at McNeil Technologies, and from 2003 to 2005 as a senior management consultant at R. W. Beck.

Women's advocate
Tietjen is a strong advocate for the participation of women and girls in the STEM fields. She mentors women and girls considering careers in engineering and technology, and has endowed scholarships for women in technology fields at the University of Virginia, the University of North Carolina at Charlotte, and the University of Colorado Boulder, as well as through the Society of Women Engineers. With an eye to supplying more role models for women, she regularly nominates candidates for awards and halls of fame in the engineering and technology fields. Her first nomination was for computer scientist Grace Hopper, who invented one of the first compiler related tools in 1952. In 1991 Hopper received the National Medal of Technology. Tietjen accepted the award on Hopper's behalf from President George H. W. Bush at a ceremony in the White House Rose Garden. Tietjen has nominated more than 30 inductees to the National Women's Hall of Fame across all fields of endeavor.

Writing and speaking
Tietjen is an editor for the Springer Women in Engineering series, and authored the series' introductory volume. She was a blogger for The Huffington Post from 2014 to 2018, writing about women's historical achievements.

Tietjen received training in public speaking in her first job at the Duke Power Company. She gave presentations on nuclear power for that company, and later used her speaking skills to deliver expert testimony for electric utilities before Federal and state regulatory commissions. She is also a motivational speaker on the topics of "women in engineering, historical women in engineering and science, and leadership".

Memberships and affiliations
Tietjen was elected to the national board of the Society of Women Engineers in 1988 and served as its national president from 1991-1992. She was the first woman on the board of directors of the Rocky Mountain Electrical League, as well as that group's first woman president.

She was board chair of the Girl Scouts – Mile Hi Council from 1999-2007, and joined the board of the National Women's Hall of Fame from 2009-2014; in 2015 she was appointed CEO.

Tietjen is an Outside Director of the Georgia Transmission Corporation. She served as an Outside Director of Merrick & Company from 2010-2021. Since 2008, she is a trustee of the University of Virginia School of Engineering and Applied Science.

Awards and honors
Tietjen has been listed in Who's Who in Engineering, Who's Who in Science and Engineering, and Who's Who in Technology. She was inducted into the Colorado Women's Hall of Fame in 2010 and the Colorado Authors' Hall of Fame in 2019.

Personal life
In 1976 she married her first husband, a fellow engineering student whom she met at the University of Virginia, becoming known as Jill S. Baylor. They divorced in 1994. Her second husband is David Tietjen. The couple resides in Centennial, Colorado.

Bibliography
 (with Elinor Miller Greenberg)
 (with Peggy Layne)

 (with Barbara Bridges)

 (with Jillaine Newman and Merrill Amos)
 (with Charlotte. S. Waisman)
 (with Betty Reynolds)
 (with Kristy Schloss)
 (with Betty Reynolds)
 (with Betty Reynolds)

References

External links
"Far More Colorado" video interview with Jill Tietjen, March 30, 2013
"Great Colorado Women - Jill Tietjen 'Engineering Women back into History'" (video)

1954 births
Living people
American women engineers
20th-century women engineers
21st-century women engineers
American electrical engineers
American women bloggers
American bloggers
Hampton High School (Virginia) alumni
21st-century American women writers
University of Virginia School of Engineering and Applied Science alumni
University of North Carolina at Charlotte alumni
University of Colorado Boulder faculty
People from Denver
People from Newport News, Virginia
Engineers from Virginia
20th-century American women writers